The 2004–05 season was the 59th season in FK Partizan's existence. This article shows player statistics and all matches (official and friendly) that the club played during the 2004–05 season.

Players

Squad information

Transfers

In

Out

Loan in

Loan out

Friendlies

Competitions

First League of Serbia and Montenegro

Overview

League table

Serbia and Montenegro Cup

UEFA Cup

Second Qualifying Round

First round

Group E

Round of 32

Round of 16

See also
 List of FK Partizan seasons
List of unbeaten football club seasons

References

External links
 Official website
 Partizanopedia 2004-2005  (in Serbian)

FK Partizan seasons
Partizan
Serbian football championship-winning seasons